National Bank of Egypt (NBE) is a bank founded in Egypt in June 1898, and is the country's largest bank (2013) in terms of assets, deposits, loans, bank-capital, number of total branches, and employees.

NBE has 540 branches within the country, assets of £E 366,6 bn., total deposits of £E 312,7 bn., and total loans and advances of £E 114,7 bn. 
As of 2007, the National Bank of Egypt accounted for 23% of the Egyptian banking system's total assets, 25% of total deposits and 25% of total loans and advances. NBE also financed about 24% of Egypt's foreign trade during the year. NBE also accounts for 74% of the credit card market and 40% of the debit cards in Egypt.

According to the July 2007 issue of the Banker, in terms of total assets, NBE ranks 226th among the top 1000 world banks and ranks 3rd among the Arab banks.

History

19th century
During the 25th of June   1898, Sir Ernest Cassel (50% ownership), the three brothers Joseph Suares (1837-1900), Raphael Suares (1846-1909) and Felix Isaac Suares (1844 - 1906), Moise Cattaui (25%) and Constantine Salvagos of Alexandria (25%) established the National Bank of Egypt (NBE), though Cassel remained in England.  NBE established an agency in London.

20th century
1901 NBE opened a branch in Khartoum. It obtained a privileged position as banker to and for the government and acted as the semi-official central bank. Over time, it added further agencies and branches in the Sudan.
1902 NBE established the Agricultural Bank of Egypt.
1906 NBE established the Bank of Abyssinia in Addis Ababa. The bank received a 50-year monopoly and was the Ethiopian government's fiscal agent as well as the sole issuer of currency.
1925 Lloyds Bank transferred to NBE the branches in Cairo and Alexandria that it acquired with its purchase of Cox & Kings in 1923 and from the Bank of British West Africa.
1931 The Bank of Abyssinia was liquidated and the Ethiopian government established Bank of Ethiopia to replace it.
1936 Agricultural Bank of Egypt was liquidated.
1940 All the staff and the Board of the bank were largely Egyptian.
1951 A decree gave NBE the status of the Central Bank for Egypt.
1957 The Banking Act confirmed the status of NBE as Egypt's Central Bank.
1959 The government of the Sudan nationalized NBE's assets in the Sudan, using them as the basis for the new central bank, the Bank of Sudan
1960 The Egyptian government nationalized NBE and created a separate central bank.
1961 Citibank sold to NBE its Egyptian assets and liabilities. Citibank had entered in 1955 but was forced to leave by the nationalization decree.
1975 Chase Manhattan Bank (49%) and National Bank of Egypt (51%) established Commercial International Bank (CIB).
1976 NBE, together with 19 other Arab and four US banks, established Arab American Bank as a wholesale bank operating in New York.
1982 NBE established a subsidiary in the UK.
1987 Chase sold its shares in CIB to NBE and CIB changed its name to Commercial International Bank, SAE. Partial privatization in 1993 and a GDR issue in 1996 reduced NBE's share to 34%. NBE established a rep office in South Africa and a banking subsidiary in London, which took over the assets and operations of NBE's previous subsidiary and its by then two branches there.

21st century
2000 NBE established a NY branch to take over the business of Arab American Bank.
2005 NBE acquired Mohandes Bank, which had been established in 1979 as a commercial bank. It also acquired Bank of Commerce and Development, known as "Al Tigaryoon".
2006 NBE opened a representative office in Dubai.
2008 NBE upgraded its representative office in Shanghai into a branch.

Overseas operations
NBE has one subsidiary external to Egypt, within London, Britain, the only subsidiary of the bank.

United States operations of the bank, commencing at some time during 2001, are directed from within an office of  the Black Rock Building located on 40 East, 52nd street of New York City  

Branches in New York and Shanghai, and representative offices in Johannesburg and Dubai

Awards
Best Banking Performer, Egypt in 2016 by Global Brands Magazine Award.

References

Bibliography

External links

National Bank of Egypt Official site

Banks of Egypt
Banks established in 1898
Egyptian brands
1898 establishments in Egypt
Former central banks
Government-owned companies of Egypt
Government-owned banks